William Reader (1704-1774) was Archdeacon of Cork  from 1745 until his death.

Reader  was born in Dublin and educated at Trinity College, Dublin. He held living at Nohoval, Kilmonoge, and Dunisky. He was also Prebendary of Rathcoony in Cork from 1732 to 1745.

References

Alumni of Trinity College Dublin
Archdeacons of Cork
Christian clergy from Dublin (city)
18th-century Irish Anglican priests
1704 births
1774 deaths